My First Love may refer to:
 My First Love (1945 film), a 1945 French drama film
 My First Love (1988 film), a 1988 comedy-romance TV film
 My First Love (TV series), a 2018 South Korean television series

Music
"My First Love", song by Gary Usher and Brian Wilson for the 1964 film Muscle Beach Party
"My First Love", John Fred and the Playboys
 "My First Love" (René & Angela song), 1983
 "My First Love" (Atlantic Starr song), 1989
"My First Love",  first solo single Takako Uehara 1999 
"My First Love",  Avant from My Thoughts
"My First Love",  Carl Thomas Let's Talk About It  2004